A referendum on the length of terms of office was held in Liberia on 4 May 1869. The proposals put forward by Parliament on 29 January 1869 would increase the presidential term from two to four years, increase the term of House of Representatives members from two to four years, and increase the term of office of Senators from four to eight years. President-elect Edward James Roye claimed that the changes were approved and that he would remain in office until 1873. However, the legislature, which oversaw the counting process, declared the proposals to be rejected.

Results

References

Liberia
1869 in Liberia
Constitutional referendums in Liberia
Referendums in Liberia
May 1869 events